Gehyra rohan is a species of gecko endemic to Papua New Guinea.

References

Gehyra
Reptiles described in 2016